John Russell Watson (22 August 1910 – 7 March 1980) played first-class cricket for Somerset between 1933 and 1936. He was born at Caundle Purse, Sherborne, Dorset and died at Yeovil, Somerset.

Watson was a right-handed batsman used mainly by Somerset in the lower order. In his first match, against Derbyshire at Ilkeston in May 1933, he came in for his second innings with the Somerset score on 63 for six wickets, Somerset and Derbyshire having been dismissed for 87 and 81 all out respectively in their first innings. Watson hit 56 and shared an eighth wicket partnership of 92 with Michael Bennett, though Derbyshire then won the match easily.

Watson played seven further games for Somerset that season, but his highest score in these matches was only 33, and a few matches in each of the 1934, 1935 and 1936 seasons were no more successful.

After the Second World War, he played in a few Minor Counties matches for Dorset.

References

1910 births
1980 deaths
English cricketers
Somerset cricketers
Dorset cricketers